Hristo Dimitrov (born September 23, 1991) is a Bulgarian male acrobatic gymnast. With partners Borislav Borisov, Vladislav Borisov and Dennis Andreev, Dimitrov achieved 4th in the 2014 Acrobatic Gymnastics World Championships.

References

1991 births
Living people
Bulgarian acrobatic gymnasts
Male acrobatic gymnasts